Moshe Bar-Asher (born 1939, Ksar es Souk, Morocco) is an Israeli linguist and the president of the Academy of the Hebrew Language in Jerusalem.

Biography
Moshe Ben Harush (later Bar-Asher) was born in Ksar es Souk (modern Errachidia), Morocco. He immigrated to Israel in 1951 when he was twelve years old. 

Bar-Asher received his Ph.D from the Hebrew University in 1976.

Academic career
Between 1981 and 1983 he was chair of Hebrew University's Department of the Hebrew Language. From 1983 to 1986 he served as chair of the university's Institute for Jewish Studies. In 1987 he became vice president of the Academy of the Hebrew Language, of which he was appointed president in 1993.

Bar-Asher's scholarship focuses on Rabbinic Hebrew, Palestinian Syriac and Jewish languages.

Awards and recognition

 Eliezer Samson Rosenthal Prize for Talmudic studies (1988)
 Israel Prize in the field of Hebrew language and Jewish languages (1993)
 Honorary doctorate from the Institut National des Langues et Civilisations Orientales (1995)
 Yitzhak Ben-Zvi Prize for research into the customs of Oriental Jewry (2002)
 Honorary doctorate from Haifa University (2005)
 Rothschild Prize (2008)
 EMET Prize (2012)

Published works

See also
 List of Israel Prize recipients
 List of Israeli Mizrahi Jews and Sephardi Jews

References

External links
 The Academy of the Hebrew Language

Hebrew University of Jerusalem alumni
Academic staff of the Hebrew University of Jerusalem
Israeli people of Moroccan-Jewish descent
1939 births
Linguists from Israel
Living people